RMS (later HMT) Royal Edward was a passenger ship belonging to the Canadian Northern Steamship Company that was sunk during the First World War with a large loss of life while transporting Commonwealth troops. She was launched in 1907 as RMS Cairo for a British mail service to Egypt.

Design and construction 
Cairo and sister ship Heliopolis were built by the Fairfield Shipbuilding and Engineering Company of Govan, Scotland. Cairo was launched in July 1907 and entered service in January 1908. She could accommodate up to 1,114 passengers in three classes: 344 in first class, 210 in second class, and 560 in third.

Prewar career 

Cairo entered service for the Egyptian Mail Steamship Company, a British-owned company that provided a fast mail service between Marseilles and Alexandria. The service was not successful and Cairo and sister ship Heliopolis were laid up in 1909 when the service ended.

Both ships were sold to the newly established Toronto-based Canadian Northern Steamship Company, a subsidiary of the Canadian Northern Railway, in 1910, operating under its Royal Line brand. Cairo was renamed Royal Edward, Heliopolis Royal George, and they were refitted for the North Atlantic. Royal Edward sailed from Avonmouth to Montreal in the summer and to Halifax in the winter. At the outbreak of World War I Royal Edward and Royal George were requisitioned for use as troopships.

World War I 

Royal Edward was used to bring Canadian troops to Europe before being used as an internment ship anchored off Southend-on-Sea.

On 28 July 1915, Royal Edward embarked 1,367 officers and men at Avonmouth. The majority were reinforcements for the British 29th Infantry Division, with members of the Royal Army Medical Corps. All were destined for Gallipoli. Royal Edward was reported off the Lizard on the evening of 28 July, and had arrived at Alexandria on 10 August, a day after sister ship Royal George had sailed from Devonport. Royal Edward sailed for Moudros on the island of Lemnos, a staging point for the Dardanelles.

On the morning of 13 August, Royal Edward passed the British hospital ship , heading in the opposite direction. Oberleutnant zur See Heino von Heimburg in the German submarine  was off the island of Kandeloussa and saw both ships. She sank by the stern within six minutes.

Royal Edward was able to get off an SOS before losing power, and Soudan arrived on the scene at 10:00 after making a 180° turn and rescued 440 men in six hours. Two French destroyers and some trawlers rescued another 221. According to authors James Wise and Scott Baron, Royal Edwards death toll was 935 and was high because Royal Edward had just completed a boat drill and the majority of the men were below decks re-stowing their equipment. Other sources report different numbers of casualties, from 132  to 1,386  or 1,865. An Admiralty casualty list, published in The Times in September 1915, named 13 officers and 851 troops as missing believed drowned, a total of 864 lost, including posthumous Victoria Cross recipient Cuthbert Bromley and footballer Walter Miller.

Gallery 
Photos taken aboard the hospital ship Soudan.

See also 
List by death toll of ships sunk by submarines

Notes

References

Bibliography

Further reading

External links
 IWM Interview with survivor Arthur Bonney
 IWM Interview with survivor Harold Barrow

Ships built in Govan
1907 ships
Passenger ships of the United Kingdom
Troop ships of the Royal Navy
Ships sunk by German submarines in World War I
World War I shipwrecks in the Aegean Sea
Maritime incidents in 1915
Passenger ships of Canada